Waqar Ali  (Urdu: وقار علی) born in Karachi 16 jan 1966

he is a Pakistani musician and singer working mostly 

in Pakistan.

Ali has produced many albums and singles for the Pakistan film industry.  His father is the classical singer Shafqat Hussein, and Waqar Ali often works with his elder brother Sajjad Ali.  Ali composed the 1998 film Aik Aur Love Story and is the composer of the 2007 Pakistani TV drama series Sill.

He has worked with singers Rahat Fateh Ali Khan, Sajjad Ali, Shabnam Majeed, Atif Aslam, Lucky Ali, Qurat-ul-Ain Balouch and others. Over more than two recent decades, Waqar Ali has evolved into one of the best TV music composers in Pakistan.

Discography

Music albums and TV drama serials
Waqar Ali's focus has been mainly TV drama serials theme songs:

 Jane Woh Kaise Log The Jinke Pyar Ko Pyar Mila, TV Drama Serial, Pyarey Afzal (2013)
 Vicky (1986) Music Album
 Vicky and Ayesha (1998) Music Album
 Eik Tara (2000) Music Album
 Mera Naam Hai Mohabbat (2001) Music Album
 Aansoo (2000) TV Drama Serial 
 Thori Khushi Thora Gham (2002) Drama Serial
 Moorat (2004) ARY Digital Drama Serial
 Chandni (TV series) Drama Serial 
 Riyasat Drama Serial 
 Humsafar (2011) Hum TV Drama Serial ("Waqar Ali's breakthrough to real success") 
 Manzil Drama Serial 
 Makan Drama Serial 
 Sarkar Sahab Drama Serial
 Sukhay Pattay (Joint Pakistan-India drama serial, Waqar Ali composed the background music)
 Sill Drama Serial
 Ashk Drama Serial
 Thakan Drama Serial
 Roshan Sitara Drama Serial
 Ab ke sawan barse Drama Serial
 Behkawa Drama Serial
 Main baba ki ladli Drama Serial
 Jannat se nikali hui aurat Drama Serial
 Mata-e-jaan hai tu Drama Serial
 Do Qadam Door Thay Drama Serial 
 Nadamat Drama Serial
 Meri Ladli Drama Serial
 Meri Beti Drama Serial
 Tanha bikhra toota mera mann Drama Serial
 Aisa Kyun Drama Serial
 Tishnagi Drama Serial
 Khuda Ki Basti Drama Serial
 Khushboo ka ghar Drama Serial
 Bahu Rani Drama Serial
 Umme Kulsoom Drama Serial
 Maaye Ni Drama Serial
 Mera Saaein
 Jo Chale Tu Jaan se Guzar Gaye Drama Serial
 Main Chand Si Drama Serial
 Ek Nazar Meri Taraf Drama Serial
 Mehmoodabad Ki Malkain Drama Serial
 Kuch Pyar Ka Pagalpan Bhi Tha Drama Serial
 Mera Saaein 2
 Bin Teray Drama Serial
 Dil-i-Muztar Drama Serial with award-winning soundtrack by Waqar Ali 
 Pyaray Afzal (2013) Drama serial
 Teri Berukhi Drama Serial
 Good Morning Pakistan TV show

Filmography 
 Aik Aur Love Story (1999)
 Love Mein Ghum (2011)
 Wrong No. (2015) 
 Bin Roye (2015) song "O Yara" singer : Ankit Tiwari, Composed by Waqar Ali
 Laloolal.com (2016)

Singles 
 Paisay Anay De (early 1990s)
 Thori Khushi Thora Gham
 Tumhare Husn Ka Jalwa Jo Aam Ho Jaaye, Sung by and music composed by Waqar Ali
 Tuhfa tujhe teri salgira
 Mera naam hae muhabbat
 Aansoo (2000), PTV drama serial's Title Song composed by Waqar Ali
 Shikwa nahin, na dard koi bhi
 Tum kaesi muhabbat karte ho ?
 Bin Tere

Awards
 Nigar Award for Best Music Director in 1999 for Aik Aur Love Story (1999 film).

References

External links 
 , Waqar Ali on IMDb
 Waqar Ali's interview for Manzil
 Waqar Ali's interview for Moorat

Living people
Pakistani film score composers
Pakistani musicians
Pakistani pop singers
Pakistani male singers
Pakistani composers
People from Karachi
Year of birth missing (living people)
Nigar Award winners